A beauty pageant also known as beauty contest is a competition based mainly on the physical beauty of its contestants.

Beauty contest may also refer to:

 Keynesian beauty contest, a concept in economics and game theory
 Beauty Contest (Rugrats), an episode from the animated series Rugrats
 Beauty Pageant (Parks and Recreation), an episode from the television series Parks and Recreation